The Women's 4 × 100 metres relay event at the 2011 World Championships in Athletics was held at the Daegu Stadium on 4 September.

Runners from the United States had provided the fastest times before the competition, but bad baton exchanges had seen their teams disqualified at both the 2008 Olympics and the 2009 World Championships. The Americans and Jamaica, the defending world relay champions, were seen as the primary contenders for the title. Ukraine and Russia (the Olympic title holder) were the next fastest entrants into the championships.

The first semi-final was won by a ragged looking Jamaican team.  France followed Jamaica into the final.  In third place, Brazil set the South American record and qualified for the final by time.  China false started out of the event.  The second semi-final was won by Trinidad and Tobago, setting their national record, with Ukraine following them into the final.  Russia also qualified on time.  In the third semi-final, the USA, running in lane 2 ran the world leader to qualify, along with Nigeria.  In lane 3, Bahamas' Anthonique Strachan fell as the modern version of the golden girls tried to qualify.  Bahamas eventually finished while Germany was unable to complete their first handoff.

In the final, Shelly-Ann Fraser-Pryce put Jamaica into the lead, but strong legs from Allyson Felix and Marshevet Myers brought the United States back into contention.  Despite their recent history of poor handoffs, the United States executed their final baton exchange perfectly, gaining a couple of metres on Jamaica.  Given the lead, Carmelita Jeter was able to hold off a closing Veronica Campbell-Brown for the win.  Jamaica set their national record in second.  Ukraine's Hrystyna Stuy in lane 8 ran down France and Trinidad and Tobago to finish a distant third.

Medalists

Records

Qualification standards

Schedule

Results

Heats 
Qualification: First 2 of each heat (Q) plus the 2 fastest times (q) advance to the final.

Final

References

External links 
 Relay results at IAAF website

Relay 4 x 100
Relays at the World Athletics Championships
2011 in women's athletics